HMS Dainty was a  destroyer of the British Royal Navy. Ordered in 1945, she was built by J. Samuel White at their Isle of Wight shipyard, being launched in 1950 and completed in 1953.

She spent the initial years of her service alternating between the Mediterranean Sea and British waters, before undergoing modifications between 1958 and 1959 and again between 1962 and 1964. After further service, including spells in the West Indies and Far East, she was decommissioned in 1969 and sold for scrap in 1971.

Construction
Dainty was one of eight  destroyers ordered on 24 January 1945, with a total of 16 ships ordered for the Royal Navy by the end of February that year. Eight of the 16 Darings were cancelled in December 1945, before they were laid down, but construction of the remaining eight ships continued, while three more were built by Australia.

The ship was laid down at J. Samuel White's Cowes, Isle of Wight shipyard on 17 December 1945 and was launched on 16 August 1950 and completed on 26 February 1953.

Design
The ship was of all-welded construction, and aluminium was used for internal bulkheads, in one of the first uses of this material in Royal Navy ships. The machinery was laid out in the unit arrangement, with two machinery spaces, each holding a boiler and turbine, separated by an empty compartment so that a single hit by hostile fire could not completely disable the ship.

The ship was armed with three twin QF 4.5-inch (113 mm) Mark VI dual purpose gun mounts, with a close-in anti-aircraft armament of three twin Bofors 40 mm mounts, with two stabilised STAAG mounts and one simpler, non-stabilised Mark V (or "Utility") mount. Two quintuple mounts for 21-inch (533 mm) torpedoes were carried, while anti-submarine armament consisted of a Squid anti-submarine mortar with 30 charges.  thick splinter armour was provided for the bridge, gun turrets and turret rings, while  plating protected cable runs. The ship was fitted with a Type 293Q air/surface search radar on the foremast together with a Type 274 navigation radar and a Type 291 air warning radar on the ship's mainmast. A Mark 6 director, incorporating a Type 275 radar, was mounted on the roof of the ship's bridge. Dainty had a crew of 286 officers and other ranks.

Service

On commissioning, the four ships with DC electrics, including Dainty, joined the Mediterranean Fleet, forming what would become the 2nd Destroyer Squadron. with the AC electric ships forming what would become the 5th Destroyer Squadron in the Home Fleet. The two squadrons regularly swapped between the Mediterranean and Home Fleets. Dainty was laid up in reserve in December 1955, but briefly returned to active service in February 1956 as part of an exercise to test the arrangements for raising ships from reserve. After returning to reserve in April, she returned to active service with the 2nd Destroyer Flotilla in the Mediterranean later that year.

On 29 April 1957 Dainty delivered emergency supplies, including 2000 blankets and 300 tents along with medical supplies and a team of doctors to the town of Fethiye in Turkey which had been badly damaged by a pair of earthquakes. On 2 April 1958, Dainty collided with the destroyer  when coming alongside Solebay at Portsmouth Harbour, with both destroyers being damaged in the collision. Dainty entered refit at Portsmouth on 16 April that year, where her aft set of torpedo tubes was removed, allowing a deckhouse to be added containing additional accommodation, badly needed as the Darings' large crews meant that they were cramped.

Dainty was commissioned following the refit on 20 January 1959, when she became part of the 2nd Destroyer Squadron as part of the Home and Mediterranean Fleets. She was paid off into reserve again, along with the rest of the 2nd Squadron in January 1961. She was refitted again between 1962 and 1964. The remaining set of torpedo tubes was replaced by another deckhouse, while the two STAAG Bofors mounts were replaced by simpler Mark V utility twin Bofors mounts, and the Mark 6 director was replaced by the more modern MRS3 director. These changes greatly reduced the amount of maintenance required.

Dainty recommissioned at Portsmouth in April 1965 as a member of the 23rd Escort Squadron following the refit, serving in the Mediterranean and West Indies. She was back in home waters on 31 May – 1 June 1966 when she and sister ship  and the German frigates  and  took part in ceremonies in the North Sea to mark the 50th anniversary of the Battle of Jutland. Another commission in April 1967 saw her serve two years in Home, West Indian and Far East Waters.

Fate
Dainty was paid off for disposal at Portsmouth on 31 July 1969. Dainty was sold on 1 January 1971 and broken up at Cairnryan.

Notes

References

Publications
 
 
 
 
 
 
 
 

 

Daring-class destroyers (1949) of the Royal Navy
1950 ships